Hardee Kirkland (May 23, 1868 – February 18, 1929) was an American film actor and director of the silent era who appeared on stage.  Kirkland was born in Savannah, Georgia, the son of former Confederate Brigadier General William Whedbee Kirkland and the older brother of the actress Elizabeth Kirkland, who performed as Odette Tyler. He appeared in more than 40 films between 1915 and 1925. He also directed more than 30 films between 1912 and 1914. He died in Los Angeles, California, at the age of 60.

Selected filmography

As a director

 The Awakening (1912)
 The Clue (1913)
 The Empty Studio (1913)
 Her Bitter Lesson (1912)
 The Voice of Warning (1912)
 The Lost Inheritance (1912)
 A Man Among Men (1912)
 The Fire Fighter's Love (1912)
 Prompted by Jealousy (1913)
 The Clue (1913)
 The Empty Studio (1913)
 Don't Let Mother Know (1913)
 The Pink Opera Cloak (1913)
 Nobody's Boy (1913)
 A Change of Administration (1913)
 Tommy's Atonement (1913)
 The Ex-Convict's Plunge (1913)
 The Fate of Elizabeth (1913)
 Her Husband's Friend (1913)
 Through Another Man's Eyes (1913)
 The Adventures of a Watch; or, Time Flies and Comes Back (1913)
 The Price of the Free (1913)
 The Golden Cloud (1913)
 The Speedway of Despair (1914)

As an actor

 The Galley Slave (1915) – Baron La Bois
 The Lost Bridegroom (1916) – Black McQuirk
 Les Misérables (1917) – Javert
 When False Tongues Speak (1917)
 Five Thousand an Hour (1918)
 Eye for Eye (1918) – Rambert, curcis proprietorThe Library of Congress American Silent Feature Film Survival Catalog:Eye For Eye
 The Peace of Roaring River (1919) – Nils OlsenThe AFI Catalog of Feature Films: The Peace of Roaring
 Johnny-on-the-Spot (1919) – Dr. Barnabas Bunyon
 The Master Man (1919)
 In Wrong (1919) - Henry Wallace
 Madame X (1920) – Dr. Chessel
 A Splendid Hazard (1920) – Admiral Killegrew
 Officer 666 (1920) - Police Captain
 From the Ground Up (1920) – Mr. Carswell, Sr.
 The Ace of Hearts (1921) – Mr. Morgridge
 A Perfect Crime (1921) – President Halliday
 The Lure of Jade (1921)
 Roads of Destiny (1921) – Mr. Hardy
 Ladies Must Live (1921)
 Youth to Youth (1922) – Mr. Taylor
 Without Compromise (1922)
 Very Truly Yours (1922) – Doctor Maddox
 They Like 'Em Rough (1922) – Richard Wells Sr.
 The Face Between (1922) – Mr. Hartwell
 Sherlock Brown (1922) – General Bostwick
 Youth to Youth (1922) – Taylor
 Hell's Hole (1923) – a guardian
 Are You a Failure? (1923) – Gregory Thorpe
 While Paris Sleeps (1923) – Mr. O'Keefe, Sr.
 Woman-Proof (1923) – Col. Lynwood
 The Arizona Romeo (1925) – John Wayne
 Bad Boy (1925) – father of Jimmie
 Private Affairs (1925)
 The Shadow on the Wall'' (1925) – Mr. Hode

References

External links

 
 

1868 births
1929 deaths
American male film actors
American male silent film actors
American film directors
Male actors from Georgia (U.S. state)
20th-century American male actors